This is a partial discography of Wolfgang Amadeus Mozart's opera Don Giovanni.

Audio recordings

Video recordings

References

External links

Opera discographies
Operas by Wolfgang Amadeus Mozart